There are several newspapers named Tri-County News:

Tri-County News (Minnesota), based in Kimball, Minnesota, USA.
Tri-County News (Oregon), based in Junction City, Oregon 
Tri-County News (Pennsylvania), based in Mercer, Butler, Lawrence, and Venango Counties in Pennsylvania
Tri-County News (Kiel, Wisconsin), based in Kiel, Wisconsin, USA.
Tri-County News (Osseo, Wisconsin), based in Osseo, Wisconsin, USA.
Tri-County News (Gackle, North Dakota)